The leukotriene B4 receptors (BLTRs) include the following two receptors:

 Leukotriene B4 receptor 1 (BLTR1)
 Leukotriene B4 receptor 2 (BLTR2)

See also
 Eicosanoid receptor
 Leukotriene receptor

References

G protein-coupled receptors